Asian Surinamese people or Surinamese people of Asian descent, are Surinamese people whose ancestry lies within the continent of Asia.

The results of a 2012 census in Suriname showed that of the 542,000 residents, 27% are of Indian descent and 14% are Javanese.  "Chinese" ethnicity was not recorded, instead being grouped in "Other", along with "Amerindian" and "White".  In the 2004 census, 1.8% were Chinese.

See also
 Chinese Surinamese
 Indo-Surinamese
 Javanese Surinamese

References